The 1976 NBA playoffs was the postseason tournament of the National Basketball Association's 1975–76 season. The tournament concluded with the Eastern Conference champion Boston Celtics defeating the Western Conference champion Phoenix Suns 4 games to 2 in the NBA Finals. The series was highlighted by Game 5, a 3-OT victory by Boston. The Celtics won their 13th NBA title, second in the Dave Cowens era. Jo Jo White was named NBA Finals MVP.

This is the last post season of using 10 team format, The 1977 NBA Playoffs Expand To 12.

The Suns earned their first two playoff series victories in franchise history to advance to the NBA Finals; they won their second Western Conference title in 1993, and their third title in 2021.

The sixth-year Cleveland Cavaliers made their first playoff appearance and won their first playoff series.

This was the final playoff appearance for the Buffalo Braves franchise in Buffalo and last until 1992, when they returned as the Los Angeles Clippers.

This would prove the last Conference Finals appearance for the Golden State Warriors until 2015 under the leadership of Steph Curry.

The Philadelphia 76ers made the playoffs for the first time since 1971, starting a 12-season run that included four NBA Finals appearances (1977, 1980, 1982, and 1983).

Despite winning their division with a losing record of 38–44, the Milwaukee Bucks were forced to play in the best of three first round against the Detroit Pistons.

This is also noted to be the most recent NBA Playoffs that did not include a sweep and the last time a team from Texas did not appear in the playoffs.

Bracket

First round

Eastern Conference first round

(4) Philadelphia 76ers vs. (5) Buffalo Braves

First Time 5th Seed Beats The 4th Seed
This was the first playoff meeting between these two teams.

Western Conference first round

(4) Milwaukee Bucks vs. (5) Detroit Pistons

This was the first playoff meeting between these two teams.

Conference semifinals

Eastern Conference semifinals

(1) Boston Celtics vs. (5) Buffalo Braves

This was the second playoff meeting between these two teams, with the Celtics winning the first meeting.

(2) Cleveland Cavaliers vs. (3) Washington Bullets

 Bingo Smith hits game winning jumper to tie series.

 Jim Cleamons hits game-winning tip-in.

 Dick Snyder hits the series-winning shot with 4 seconds left.

This was the first playoff meeting between these two teams.

Western Conference semifinals

(1) Golden State Warriors vs. (5) Detroit Pistons

This was the second playoff meeting between these two teams, with the Warriors winning the only meeting when both teams were based in Philadelphia and Fort Wayne respectively.

(2) Seattle SuperSonics vs. (3) Phoenix Suns

This was the first playoff meeting between these two teams.

Conference finals

Eastern Conference finals

(1) Boston Celtics vs. (2) Cleveland Cavaliers

This was the first playoff meeting between these two teams.

Western Conference finals

(1) Golden State Warriors vs. (3) Phoenix Suns

This was the first playoff meeting between these two teams.

NBA Finals: (E1) Boston Celtics vs. (W3) Phoenix Suns

 As John Havlicek hit the clutch shot as time ran out for Boston in the second OT, the fans crowded the floor in celebration, thinking that the game was over. However, the clock was supposed to stop on the basket, and the referees had to bring the Celtics back onto the floor and put one second back on the clock. Meanwhile, Paul Westphal called a timeout that the Suns didn't have which would result in a technical foul, forcing Jo Jo White to shoot and make the technical free throw which put the Celtics up by 2, and then Gar Heard hit the game-tying buzzer-beater to force the third OT.

This was the first playoff meeting between these two teams.

References

External links
Basketball-Reference.com's 1976 NBA Playoffs page

National Basketball Association playoffs
Playoffs

fi:NBA-kausi 1975–1976#Pudotuspelit